Arthur Takes Over is a 1948 American comedy film directed by Malcolm St. Clair and written by Mauri Grashin. The film stars Lois Collier, Richard Crane, Skip Homeier, Ann E. Todd and Jerome Cowan. The film was released on April 7, 1948, by 20th Century Fox.

Plot

Cast   
Lois Collier as Margaret Bixby
Richard Crane as James Clark
Skip Homeier as Arthur Bixby
Ann E. Todd as Valarie Jeanne Bradford
Jerome Cowan as George Bradford
Barbara Brown as Fiora Bixby
William Bakewell as Lawrence White
Howard Freeman as Bert Bixby
Joan Blair as Mrs. Bradford
Almira Sessions as Mrs. Barnafogle
Jeanne Gail as Betty Lou
Donald Kerr as Cab Driver
Luana Walters as Newspaper Woman

References

External links 
 

1948 films
1940s English-language films
20th Century Fox films
American comedy films
1948 comedy films
Films directed by Malcolm St. Clair
American black-and-white films
1940s American films